The Disregard of Timekeeping is the debut album by British band Bonham, released in 1989. It was produced by Bob Ezrin, who had previously worked with Alice Cooper, Pink Floyd, and Kiss; in addition to his usual production duties, he also co-wrote three of the tracks. The album features Trevor Rabin as a guest, who was the lead guitarist and songwriter with Yes from 1982 to 1994.

"Wait For You"'s music video was filmed at "Disney-MGM Studios' New York backlot".

Reception
William Ruhlmann of AllMusic stated the record was "palatable, but without the famous name it would be hard to distinguish from the army of other Zep imitators".

Track listing

Personnel
Daniel MacMaster – lead and backing vocals, keyboard
Ian Hatton – lead and rhythm guitars, backing vocals
John Smithson – bass guitar, keyboards, violin, backing vocals
Jason Bonham – drums, percussion, backing vocals

Additional personnel
 Trevor Rabin – bass on "Bringing Me Down", "Holding on Forever" and "Don't Walk Away", backing vocals
 Duncan Faure – backing vocals
 Jimmy Zavala – harmonica on "Bringing Me Down"
 Bill Millay – keyboard programming, MIDI
 Bob Ezrin – Orchestration

Production
Produced by Bob Ezrin
Engineered by Brian Christian, Bob Ezrin, Stan Katayama
Assistant engineers: Rick Butz, Craig Johnson, Scott Pontius, Mike Tacci
Mixing: Stan Katayama
Mastering: Stephen Marcussen

Charts

Album

Singles

References

External links
[ "The Disregard of Timekeeping" at allmusic]

1989 debut albums
Albums produced by Bob Ezrin
Epic Records albums
Bonham (band) albums